Probe is an American science fiction television series, created by veteran television writer Michael I. Wagner and science fiction author Isaac Asimov as a sort of modern version of Jonny Quest or Tom Swift.  It aired on ABC.  Michael I. Wagner wrote the two-hour pilot, and became Executive Producer for the series. The pilot and series starred Parker Stevenson as Austin James, an asocial genius who solved high tech crimes, and Ashley Crow as James' new secretary Mickey Castle.

The show began as a mid-season replacement and was canceled after a two-month run of the pilot and six episodes. Entire episodes have made their way on the Internet through video-sharing sites including YouTube. It has never been officially released on home media, although it did re-air in the mid-1990s on SYFY, when it was still known as the Sci-Fi Channel in its block of short-lived TV series.

Some episodes of the show revolved around Serendip, a company founded by Austin that he has no interest in running. Mickey, his Serendip-appointed secretary, plays Dr. Watson to Austin's Holmes.

Characters
Austin James (played by Parker Stevenson): A genius-level scientist and inventor with eidetic memory, Austin is constantly thinking, inventing ground-breaking technology and seeking answers to various mysteries and problems. One disadvantage to his vast intellect is that it isolated him from his peers from a very early age. As a result, he is awkward and uncomfortable in normal social situations, and very reclusive. His manner can be at times overly brusque, but he has a deep love of humanity. Austin is occasionally called in by local police to investigate baffling homicides, though he professes to not understand the motivation for murder. He founded the think tank Serendip, but he has no interest in managing its day-to-day affairs, preferring to spend most of his time engaged in a variety of experiments and investigations at his "workshop," a refurbished warehouse which serves as his home and laboratory.
Michelle "Mickey" Castle (played by Ashley Crow): Mickey seems an unlikely candidate to serve as Austin James' secretary, as she lacks any background in science and relies more on her instincts instead of logic. Though she initially finds Austin's genius and eccentricities intimidating (and infuriating), Mickey comes to enjoy the adventure of working for him. Similarly, while Austin has fired every other secretary foisted upon him by Serendip, he is soon captivated by Mickey's uncanny knack for providing unique observations that help him in his investigations.
Howard Millhouse (played by Jon Cypher): As Serendip's long-suffering director, Howard constantly finds himself at wit's end, managing the company founded by Austin, and bankrolling his various experiments. Howard's attempts to draw Austin out of his warehouse to take a more active interest in his own company have only served to make Austin keep Serendip further at bay.
Graham McKinley (played by Clive Revill): Howard's apparent successor at Serendip who also butts heads with Austin from time to time over various projects.

Episodes

References

External links

1980s American science fiction television series
Television series by Universal Television
1988 American television series debuts
1988 American television series endings
English-language television shows
American Broadcasting Company original programming
Television shows set in Texas